The Shaun Murphy Band is a "Blues" musical band. The group was founded in early 2009 by veteran blues and soul singer Shaun Murphy. Within a matter of a few weeks after release of the band's first album, Livin' The Blues']], the album jumped to position 10 on the Roots Report Top 50 Blues Weekly Chart. This chart is a composite of the number of "spins" or radio play throughout the United States.

Early career of Shaun Murphy
Shaun Murphy, living in her then home town of Detroit, Michigan, in the early seventies, was noticed by personnel from Motown Records in a local theater production. (Murphy previously had a few years of experience singing in local Detroit bands, after high school where she gained singing experience in choir). She recorded an album with Meat Loaf, under a subsidiary of Motown, Rare Earth Records. The duo, Stoney & Meatloaf, recorded only one album under the label. The group was short lived.  Murphy was retained under contract by Motown after the album release. She then went on over the years to tour and do studio work with Eric Clapton, Joe Walsh, Bob Seger, The Moody Blues, Bruce Hornsby, Glenn Frey, Phil Collins, John Hiatt, Leon Russell, Alice Cooper, Ted Nugent, Sheena Easton, Little Feat, and many others.

Band members 2009
Larry Van Loon studied at the University of Hartford's Hartt College of Music, performing with and under the direction of such notables as Aaron Copland, Isaac Stern, Leonard Rose, and various soloists from the New York City and Metropolitan Opera(s). In the late 1970s, his group evolved into the Kansas City Blues Band which recorded and toured during the 1980s. Eventually, Van Loon hit the road, and shared the stage with Muddy Waters, B. B. King, Willie Dixon, John Lee Hooker, Bobby "Blue" Bland, Buddy Guy, Martha Reeves, Jay McShann, Gregg Allman, Air Supply, The Winans, The Mighty Clouds of Joy, and Oleta Adams to name a few. Van Loon is currently the keyboardist for the Andy T-Nick Nixon Band.

Mike Caputy (born Buffalo, New York), is an American drummer, who hit the Buffalo music scene playing for Ike Smith and "Free Spirit." At age 21, Caputy earned his first triple platinum record with R&B soul artist Rick James. Caputy has worked with a wide variety of musicians including T. Graham Brown, David Lee Murphy, Johnny Neel, Big & Rich, Marty Stuart, and Rick James. He was inducted into the 'Buffalo Music Hall of Fame' in 2002.

Kenne Cramer Kenne attended the Guitar Institute of Technology in Los Angeles, honing his craft on guitar with such noted players as Pete Anderson, Jennifer Batten, and Jesse Gresse, among others. In 1989 Kenne began touring full-time with T. Graham Brown. In 1992, Cramer started working with Lee Roy Parnell who used Cramer on many of his demo sessions including the recording: "Rockin' the House", used by the Texas Rangers. During the next eight years, Cramer toured with several national and international acts, beginning with Ronnie Milsap. While playing in Myrtle Beach, South Carolina, Cramer caught the ear of international singer Engelbert Humperdinck, leading to tours all over the world and the opportunity to record two albums and a live video concert.

Discography
2009 – [[Livin' The Blues (album)|Livin' The Blues'

External links
 Official website
 Interview with Shaun Murphy @ Digitalinterviews.com

American blues musical groups